Mae Soi is a tambon (subdistrict) of Chom Thong District, in Chiang Mai Province, Thailand. In 2005 it had a population of 8,715 people. The tambon contains 14 villages.

References

Tambon of Chiang Mai province
Populated places in Chiang Mai province